Argentina has been one of the most prolific issuers of revenue stamps. Stamps have been issued by both the Argentine Republic and individual Argentine provinces and covered a wide range of duties from taxes on documents to hat taxes. The stamps form one of the most complex studies in revenue philately and have been exhaustively catalogued by Clive Ackerman in six volumes. However, new discoveries continue to be made.

First revenue stamps
The first revenue stamps of the Republic were issued on 1 January 1878 for documentary taxes and taxes on foreign bills. Revenue stamps had been issued in the provinces from an earlier date and stamped paper had been in use since Spanish colonial times.

Gallery

See also
Postage stamps and postal history of Argentina

References

Further reading
Clive Akerman:
The revenue stamps of Argentina (Alnis guides), Glass Slipper, York, 1994. .
Collecting and displaying revenue stamps, Revenue Society of Great Britain, Hitchin, 1995. .
The presentation of revenue stamps: Taxes and duties in South America, The Revenue Society of Great Britain, 2002.
The revenue stamps of Argentina Vol.I, 2nd edition, 2002. (The Provinces and Municipalities of Buenos Aires)
The revenue stamps of Argentina Vol.II, 1st edition, 1999. (The Provinces and Municipalities of Catamarca to Corrientes) 
The revenue stamps of Argentina Vol.III, 1st edition, 2000. (The Provinces and Municipalities of Entre to Neuquen) 
The revenue stamps of Argentina Vol.IV, 1st edition, 2002. (The Provinces and Municipalities of Salta to San Luis plus Santa Fe) 
The Revenue Stamps of Argentina Vol.V, 1st edition, 2002. (The Provinces and Municipalities of Santa Fe part 2, Santiago del Estero & Tucuman) 
Revenue Stamps of the Republic of Argentina, 1st edition, 2003. (The national issues of Argentina)

Other:

Morley, W. (1904) Catalogue of the revenue stamps of South America. Being a supplement to Morley's Philatelic Journal, 1901-04. London: Walter Morley.

External links
Tax Stamps Collection

Philately of Argentina
Economy of Argentina
Argentina